The M94 Group (Canes I Group or Canes Venatici I Group) is a loose, extended group of galaxies located about 13 million light-years away in the constellations Canes Venatici and Coma Berenices.  The group is one of many groups that lies within the Virgo Supercluster (i.e. the Local Supercluster) and one of the closest groups to the Local Group.

Although the galaxies in this cluster appear to be from a single large cloud-like structure, many of the galaxies within the group are only weakly gravitationally bound, and some have not yet formed stable orbits around the center of this group.  Instead, most of the galaxies in this group appear to be moving with the expansion of the universe.

Members

The table below lists galaxies that have been consistently identified as group members in the Nearby Galaxies Catalog, the Lyons Groups of Galaxies (LGG) Catalog, and the three group lists created from the Nearby Optical Galaxy sample of Giuricin et al.

Additionally, NGC 4105 and DDO 169 are frequently but not consistently identified as members of this group in the references cited above.

The brightest member in this galaxy group is questionable and partly depends on the analysis used to determine group members.  The LGG Catalog identifies M106 as part of this group, which would make it the brightest galaxy within the group.  However, the other catalogs cited above do not identify M106 as a group member, in which case M94 would be the brightest galaxy within the group.

Canes Venatici Cloud
This galaxy group is sometimes erroneously called the Canes Venatici Cloud, a larger structure of which it is a member. A galaxy cloud is a supercluster substructure. The CVn Cloud used in this manner is identified by Tully and de Vaucoleurs.

See also
 M96 Group
 Sculptor Group
 Canes II Group (CVn II Group)

References

External links
 

 
Galaxy clusters
Virgo Supercluster
Canes Venatici
Coma Berenices